The plumbeous water redstart (Phoenicurus fuliginosus) is a passerine bird in the Old World flycatcher family Muscicapidae. It is found in South Asia, Southeast Asia and China.  Males are slate blue in colour, while females are grey.  The bird's common name refers to its colour which resembles lead.  They tend to live near fast-moving streams and rivers.

Taxonomy
The plumbeous water redstart belongs to the order Passeriformes and the family Muscicapidae.  It was previously placed in the genus Rhyacornis but was moved to Phoenicurus based on the results of a molecular phylogenetic study published in 2010. The species consists of two recognized subspecies – Phoenicurus fuliginosus fuliginosus and Phoenicurus fuliginosus affinis.  The former was described by Nicholas Aylward Vigors in 1831, while the latter was described by William Robert Ogilvie-Grant in 1906 and is found in Taiwan.  In China, the female and first-year male redstarts appear more brown at the top, leading to the possibility of classifying them as a separate race tenuirostris.

Description

The male birds are slate blue in colour with a tail that is rusty red. On the other hand, female birds are pale grey and feature a white rump.

Habitat
The bird is found in Afghanistan, Bangladesh, Bhutan, China, India, Laos, Myanmar, Nepal, Pakistan, Taiwan, Thailand, and Vietnam.  Their preferred habitats are streams, nullahs and rivers with boulders that are shaded, as well as vegetation near riverbanks.  Streams with higher populations of insects such as mayflies appear to be preferred.

However, they tend to descend to lower altitudes during the winter.

The plumbeous water redstart has been placed on the Least Concern category of the IUCN Red List, as the population has remained stable throughout the last ten years.

Behavior

The plumbeous water redstart is very protective of its habitat and will be extremely confrontational to any trespasser on its territory.

Gallery

References

External links

 Plumbeous water-redstart videos and photos on the Internet Bird Collection
  Oriental Bird Images: plumbeous water redstart  Selected images
 Xeno-canto: plumbeous water redstart  Sound recordings

plumbeous water redstart
Birds of China
Birds of the Himalayas
Birds of Eastern Himalaya
Birds of Central Asia
Birds of Laos
Birds of Myanmar
plumbeous water redstart
Articles containing video clips
Taxonomy articles created by Polbot